The television series Mission: Impossible was created by Bruce Geller. The original series premiered on the CBS network in September 1966 and consisted of 171 one-hour episodes running over seven seasons before ending in March 1973. A sequel ran from 1988 to 1990. This article lists both broadcast order and production order, which often differed considerably.

Series overview

Episodes

Season 1 (1966–67)

Season 2 (1967–68)

Season 3 (1968–69)

Season 4 (1969–70)

Season 5 (1970–71)

Season 6 (1971–72)

Season 7 (1972–73)

References

External links

Lists of American crime television series episodes
Lists of American espionage television series episodes
Mission: Impossible (1966 TV series)